Matthew Tuisamoa is a former Western Samoa international rugby league footballer.

Playing career
Tuisamoa played for Auckland in 1991 and 1992. In 1994 he played for the Counties Manukau in the Lion Red Cup, and was selected for Western Samoa when they conducted a tour of New Zealand. That year Tuisamoa also played in the World Sevens for Western Samoa.

In 2001 Tuisamoa played for the Marist-Richmond Brothers in the Bartercard Cup, and the Richmond Bulldogs in the Auckland Rugby League competition.

References

Living people
New Zealand sportspeople of Samoan descent
New Zealand rugby league players
Samoa national rugby league team players
Auckland rugby league team players
Counties Manukau rugby league team players
Marist Richmond Brothers players
Richmond Bulldogs players
Rugby league five-eighths
Year of birth missing (living people)